Gillian Mary Hanly  ( Taverner; born 1934) is a New Zealand artist. She is best known for documenting protests and social movements in New Zealand's recent history.

Early life 
Hanly was born in 1934 in Levin, New Zealand. She has two younger brothers. She grew up on a sheep farm between the sea and the town of Bulls, where the family worked hard to contribute.

She was home schooled until the age of 12, when she was sent to Nga Tawa school in Marton.

She attended the Ilam School of Fine Arts in Christchurch in the early 1950s, where she trained to be a painter. She met her husband Pat Hanly while at Ilam.

Career 
After she graduated from university she moved to London for five years, where she worked as a props buyer for a production company. After she moved back to New Zealand she worked at University Bookshop for a decade. She started working for the feminist publication Broadsheet in 1972.

Artistic career 
She has taken photographs of the 1981 Springbok tour, the sinking of the Greenpeace ship The Rainbow Warrior, the protest at Bastion Point, and the 1984 land hikoi. She has also documented the Queen Street riots and outrage at the murder of Teresa Cormack. Her photographs of the women's movement in the 1970s and 1980s featured prominently in the exhibition at Auckland War Memorial Museum, Are We There Yet? She says she is attracted to things "that were important".

Hanly was associated with the long-running feminist magazine Broadsheet. However, she does not think she is a feminist.

She also has an interest in photographing gardens.

She does not describe herself as a photographic artist, but rather she sees herself as a "documenter". Hanly has been documented social protests since the 1970s including the reclamation of Bastion Point and the 1981 Springbok Tour.

Recognition 
In the 1999 Queen's Birthday Honours, Hanly was appointed an Officer of the New Zealand Order of Merit, for services to photography. In 2019, she was awarded an Auckland War Memorial Museum medal, becoming a Companion of Auckland War Memorial Museum.

Personal life 
Hanly was married to the painter Pat Hanly until he died in 2004. She has two children with Pat, and her husband had another daughter in a different relationship.

References 

New Zealand photographers
1934 births
Living people
People from Levin, New Zealand
Ilam School of Fine Arts alumni
New Zealand women photographers
People educated at Nga Tawa Diocesan School
Officers of the New Zealand Order of Merit